GSAT-11 is an Indian geostationary communications satellite. The 5854 kg satellite is based on the new I-6K Bus and carry 40 transponders in the Ku-band and Ka-band frequencies (32 Ka × Ku-Band Forward Link Transponders and 8 Ku × Ka band Return Link Transponders), which are capable of providing up to 16 Gbit/s throughput. GSAT-11 is India's heaviest satellite.

Launch
Initially the satellite was planned to be launched in May 2018, but was delayed after ISRO recalled it back to India from the launch site in French Guiana for additional checks weeks after ISRO lost communication to another communication satellite, the GSAT-6A, soon after its launch in March 2018.

After the satellite was found fit for the launch, the new launch date had been set to 4 December 2018. GSAT 11 was launched successfully from the European Spaceport, French Guiana (Guiana Space Center) on 20:37 UTC, 4 December 2018 along with GEO-KOMPSAT-2A of KARI.

Satellite
GSAT-11 was developed at the cost of Rs. 579 Crores and its launch was procured at cost of Rs. 810.94 Crores. The payload consists of 40 high power Ku, Ka band transponders built at Space Applications Centre in Ahmedabad.

See also 
 Ariane flight VA246
 GSAT

References

External links
 Official GSAT-11 page 

GSAT satellites
Communications satellites in geostationary orbit
Spacecraft launched by India in 2018
Ariane commercial payloads
December 2018 events in South America
2018 in French Guiana